Brendan Smialowski is a photographer based in Washington, D.C., where he has created a large volume of work covering politics.

Biography 
Born circa 1981, Smialowski studied ancient history at the University of Missouri. He is a photojournalist for Agence France-Presse since 2012. He has been covering Washington, D.C. politics and events since 2003. He specializes in digital photography and covers national and international news.  While primarily a photojournalist, Smialowski's work includes a variety of techniques including portrait photography. Smialowski regularly covers the White House and Capitol Hill,  and he has covered several US presidential campaigns, including the 2008 US presidential campaign.

Works by Brendan Smialowski can be seen in The New York Times, Time, Newsweek, U.S. News & World Report, Der Spiegel, Le Point, USA Today, The Washington Post, and many other publications.

In January 2021, a photograph taken by Smialowski of Bernie Sanders sitting in a chair at the inauguration of Joe Biden went viral.

Awards 
2018 - 75th Pictures of the Year International competition:
- General News category: Award of Excellence
- News Picture Story category: Award of Excellence
2018 - WHNPA Awards:
- Political Portfolio - First Place
- Domestic News - Second Place
- Picture Story/Politics - Third Place
- Sports Feature/Reaction - Award of Excellence
- Portfolio - Award of Excellence
2017 - WHNPA Eyes of History Still Contest - First Place, Political Picture Story
2015 - WHNPA Eyes of History Still Contest - Political Photo of the Year
2010 - WHNPA Eyes of History, Capitol Hill Category, Editorial - First Place

References

External links
  - A portfolio and galleries of Brendan Smialowski's recent works.

American photographers
Year of birth missing (living people)
Living people
University of Missouri alumni